Dominican may refer to:
 Someone or something from or related to the Dominican Republic (stress on the "mi"), on the island of Hispaniola in the Greater Antilles, in the Caribbean
 People of the Dominican Republic
 Demographics of the Dominican Republic
 Culture of the Dominican Republic
 Someone or something from or related to the Commonwealth of Dominica (stress on the "ni"), an island nation in the Lesser Antilles, in the Caribbean
 People of Dominica
 Demographics of Dominica
 Culture of Dominica
The Dominican Order, a Catholic religious order

Schools
 Dominican College (disambiguation), numerous colleges throughout the world
 Dominican School of Philosophy and Theology, Berkeley, California, United States
 Dominican University (Illinois), River Forest, Illinois, United States
 Dominican University of California, San Rafael, California, United States
 Dominican University New York, Orangeburg, New York, United States

See also